The 1931 North Carolina Tar Heels football team was an American football team that represented the University of North Carolina during the 1931 college football season as a member of the Southern Conference. In their sixth year under head coach Chuck Collins, the team compiled an overall record of 4–3–3, with a mark of 2–3–3 in conference play.

Schedule

References

North Carolina
North Carolina Tar Heels football seasons
North Carolina Tar Heels football